Belpre High School is a public high school in Belpre, Ohio, United States.  It is the only high school in the Belpre City School District.  Their nickname is the Golden Eagles though their mascot is a bald eagle. Grades seven to twelve attend this school.

Athletics 

The Golden Eagles belong to the Ohio High School Athletic Association (OHSAA) and the Tri-Valley Conference, a 16-member athletic conference located in southeastern Ohio.  The conference is divided into two divisions based on school size.  The Ohio Division features the larger schools and the Hocking Division features the smaller schools, including Belpre.

Ohio High School Athletic Association State Championships
 Boys Track and Field – 1952

See also
Ohio High School Athletic Conferences

References

External links
 
 District website

High schools in Washington County, Ohio
Public high schools in Ohio
High School